The Births, Deaths, Marriages and Relationships Registration Act 2021 is a New Zealand Act of Parliament. The bill replaces the Births, Deaths, Marriages, and Relationships Registration Act 1995 with modern legislation. It also implements several recommendations from the Law Commission's review of burial and cremation law, and makes it easier for people to change the sex on their birth certificates without having to go through the Family Court or show evidence of medical treatment to change their sex.

Legislative features
The Births, Deaths, Marriages, and Relationships Registration Bill seeks to repeal and replace the Births, Deaths, Marriages, and Relationships Registration Act 1995. The bill will re-enact the majority of the 1995 Act but will also eliminate redundant provisions and make a number of small policy changes.

Key changes include:
Allowing each parent who is notifying the birth of a child to specify whether they wish to appear on the child's birth certificate as the child's mother, father, or parent.
Allowing an eligible person aged 18 and over to change their nominated sex by statutory declaration.
Allowing an eligible person aged 16 or 17 to change their nominated sex by statutory declaration without the consent of their legal guardian, with a letter of recommendation from a suitable third party. The third party must have sufficient professional or community standing (they don't necessarily have to be a health professional) and have known the minor for a minimum amount of time (e.g. to prevent doctor shopping).
Allowing the guardian of a child under 16 to change their child's nominated sex by statutory declaration. The application must be accompanied by letter of recommendation from a suitable third party.
The nominated sex may be male, female, or another sex described in the regulations.
The Registrar-General must register nominated sex if statutory requirements met.
The eligible child must confirm registered sex on turning 18 years old.

Legislative history
The Bill passed its first reading on 5 December 2017 and was referred to the Governance and Administration Committee.

On 12 August 2021, the Bill passed its second reading with support from all parties represented in the New Zealand Parliament.

The bill was unanimously approved by Parliament on its third reading on 9 December 2021. The Bill received Royal Assent on 15 December 2021. The regulation-making powers came into force the following day. The remainder of the act, apart from three clauses, will come into force no later than 15 June 2023. The three remaining clauses will come into force on 15 December 2024.

Responses
On 10 August 2018, the Human Rights Commission welcomed the Government Administration Committee's efforts to make it easier for transgender and non-binary individuals to update sex details on birth certificates. The bill has also been supported by the Māori Women's Welfare League and the National Council of Women of New Zealand.

In 2018, the feminist advocacy group Speak Up for Women was formed to oppose the sex self-identification clauses within the Births, Deaths, Marriages, and Relationships Registration Bill. The group has been criticised as transphobic by critics and faced difficulty in hosting meetings at municipal venues in Auckland, Palmerston North, Christchurch, Dunedin, Lower Hutt, and Wellington. In late June 2021, the High Court in Auckland ruled that Speak Up for Women was allowed to hold their meeting at an Auckland Council facility on the ground that it was not a hate group. The group's meetings in Nelson and Dunedin were picketed by transgender rights supporters.

Notes and references

External links

2021 in New Zealand law
LGBT history in New Zealand
LGBT-related controversies in New Zealand
Statutes of New Zealand
LGBT law in New Zealand
Transgender law